Pusia is a genus of sea snails, marine gastropod mollusks in the family Costellariidae.

Species
Species within the genus Pusia include:

 Pusia anabelae F. Fernandes, 1992
 † Pusia aturensis Lozouet, 2021 
 † Pusia avellanella (Boettger, 1906) 
 Pusia balutensis (Herrmann, 2009)
 Pusia choslenae (Cernohorsky, 1982)
 † Pusia cognata (Bellardi, 1887) 
 Pusia dautzenbergi (Poppe, Guillot de Suduiraut & Tagaro, 2006)
 † Pusia degrangei (Peyrot, 1928) 
 Pusia ebenus (Lamarck, 1811)
 Pusia elliscrossi (Rosenberg & R. Salisbury, 1991)
 Pusia granum (Forbes, 1844)
 Pusia hansenae (Cernohorsky, 1973)
 † Pusia hastata (Karsten, 1849)
 Pusia ivanmarrowi Marrow, 2017
 Pusia jenyai Fedosov, Herrmann & Bouchet, 2017
 Pusia johnwolffi (Herrmann & R. Salisbury, 2012)
 Pusia lauta (Reeve, 1845)
 † Pusia leucozona (Andrzejowski, 1830) 
 Pusia marrowi (Cernohorsky, 1973)
  Pusia micra H.-J. Wang, 1982 
 Pusia microzonias (Lamarck, 1811)
 Pusia paolinii Gori, Rosado & R. Salisbury, 2019
 †Pusia paraleucozona (Boettger, 1906) 
 † Pusia pyrenaica (Peyrot, 1928) 
 Pusia savignyi (Payraudeau, 1826)
 † Pusia semiplicata (Peyrot, 1928) 
 Pusia simoneae Marrow, 2017
 † Pusia subpyrenaica Lozouet, 2021 
 † Pusia transsylvanica (Boettger, 1902) 
 Pusia tricolor (Gmelin, 1791)
 Pusia vassardi Fedosov, Herrmann & Bouchet, 2017
 Pusia versicolor Marrow, 2017
 Pusia vicmanoui (H. Turner & Marrow, 2001)
 † Pusia virodunensis Lozouet, 2021 
 Pusia voluta Marrow, 2017
 Pusia zebrina (d'Orbigny, 1840)

Synonyms
 Pusia amabilis: synonym of Vexillum (Pusia) amabile (Reeve, 1845)
 Pusia aureolata: synonym of Vexillum (Pusia) aureolatum (Reeve, 1844)
 Pusia bernhardina (Röding, 1798): synonym of Condylomitra bernhardina (Röding, 1798)
 Pusia bibsae (Nowell-Usticke, 1969): synonym of Vexillum catenatum (Broderip, 1836)
 Pusia callipicta Sarasúa, 1978: synonym of Vexillum articulatum (Reeve, 1845) (junior secondary homonym of Vexillum callipictum Woodring, 1928: Vexillum (Pusia) josefinae Sarasúa, 1985 is a replacement name)
 Pusia cancellaroides( Anton, 1838): synonym of Vexillum (Pusia) cancellarioides (Anton, 1838)
 Pusia chibaensis Salisbury & Rosenberg, 1999: synonym of Vexillum (Pusia) chibaense (Salisbury & Rosenberg, 1999)
 Pusia crocata (Lamarck, 1811): synonym of Vexillum (Pusia) crocatum (Lamarck, 1811)
 Pusia epiphanea Rehder, 1943: synonym of Vexillum epiphaneum (Rehder, 1943) (original combination)
 Pusia gemmata (G. B. Sowerby II, 1874): synonym of Atlantilux gemmata (G. B. Sowerby II, 1874)
 Pusia karpathoensis Nordsieck, 1969 : synonym of  Mitromorpha karpathoensis (Nordsieck, 1969)
 Pusia multicostata: synonym of Vexillum (Pusia) multicostatum (Broderip, 1836)
 Pusia muriculata: synonym of Mitra (Nebularia) bernhardina (Röding, 1798)
 Pusia nodulita Sarasúa, 1978: synonym of Vexillum catenatum (Broderip, 1836)
 Pusia osiridis (Issel, 1869): synonym of Orphanopusia osiridis (Issel, 1869)
 Pusia pardalis: synonym of Vexillum (Pusia) pardale (Küster, 1840)
 Pusia patula (Reeve, 1845): synonym of Vexillum patulum (Reeve, 1845)
 Pusia sagamiensis Kuroda & Habe, 1971: synonym of Vexillum castum (H. Adams, 1872)
 Pusia splendidula Sarasúa, 1975: synonym of Vexillum variatum (Reeve, 1845)
 Pusia tuberosa: synonym of Mitra tuberosa Reeve, 1845 Pusia venusta Sarasúa, 1978: synonym of Vexillum pulchellum (Reeve, 1844)
 Pusia voncoseli Poppe, Tagaro & Salisbury, 2009:synonym of Vexillum voncoseli'' (Poppe, Tagaro & R. Salisbury, 2009

References

  Wang, H.-J. (1982). The Cenozoic gastropods from Hainan Island and Leizhou Peninsula of Guangdong Province. Memoirs of Nanjing Institute of Geology and Palaeontology, Academia Sinica. 17: 117-189.
page(s): 162

External links
 Swainson, W. (1840). A treatise on malacology or shells and shell-fish. London, Longman. viii + 419 pp
 Fedosov A.E., Puillandre N., Herrmann M., Dgebuadze P. & Bouchet P. (2017). Phylogeny, systematics, and evolution of the family Costellariidae (Gastropoda: Neogastropoda). Zoological Journal of the Linnean Society. 179(3): 541-626
 Monterosato, T. A. di. (1917). Molluschi viventi e quaternari raccolti lungo le coste della Tripolitania dall'ing. Camillo Crema. Bollettino della Società Zoologica Italiana. ser. 3, 4: 1-28, pl. 1
 W.O.Cernohorsky, The Mitridae of Fiji - The Veliger v. 8 (1965-1966)